Yuqiao Reservoir is a large reservoir in Jizhou District, Tianjin. It was built for water supply to the downtown of Tianjin as well as for flood control purposes. The reservoir is also known as Cuiping Lake, and it is a part of the Luan River-Tianjin water transfer project.

References 

Bodies of water of Tianjin
Reservoirs in China